Sad Gol (also Romanized as Şad Gol, Sad Gul, and Şad Kol) is a village in Alqurat Rural District, in the Central District of Birjand County, South Khorasan Province, Iran. At the 2006 census, its population was 81, in 28 families.

References 

Populated places in Birjand County